William C. Davis Sr. (July 21, 1938 – January 18, 2020) was an American football player, coach, and executive. He served as the head football coach at Adrian College in Adrian, Michigan for five seasons, from 1968 to 1972, compiling a record of 20–24. He was later director of pro personnel for the National Football League (NFL) Miami Dolphins, vice president of player personnel for the Cleveland Browns, and vice president of player personnel for the Philadelphia Eagles. On January 18, 2020, Davis died at the age of 81 from Alzheimer's disease.

Davis' son, Billy, is an assistant coach for the Arizona Cardinals of the NFL.

Head coaching record

College

References

1938 births
2020 deaths
Adrian Bulldogs football coaches
American men's basketball players
American football defensive backs
American football quarterbacks
Baseball players from Youngstown, Ohio
Basketball players from Youngstown, Ohio
Cleveland Browns executives
Deaths from Alzheimer's disease
High school football coaches in Ohio
Miami Dolphins executives
Michigan State Spartans football coaches
Mount Union Purple Raiders baseball players
Mount Union Purple Raiders football coaches
Mount Union Purple Raiders football players
Mount Union Purple Raiders men's basketball players
Philadelphia Eagles coaches
Philadelphia Eagles executives
Players of American football from Youngstown, Ohio
Westminster Titans football coaches
Deaths from dementia in Florida